Peter Driscoll (born October 27, 1954) is a Canadian former professional ice hockey left wing who played in the World Hockey Association and National Hockey League between 1974 and 1981. He was born in Powassan, Ontario.

Selected by the Toronto Maple Leafs in the 1974 NHL amateur draft and the Vancouver Blazers in the 1974 WHA Amateur Draft, Driscoll signed with the Blazers, moving to Calgary with them when they relocated.

After the Calgary Cowboys folded, he signed as a free agent with the Quebec Nordiques and was later traded to the Indianapolis Racers. A year later, Driscoll was part of the deal that sent Wayne Gretzky to the Edmonton Oilers on November 2, 1978 with Eddie Mio.

Moving to the NHL with the Oilers, he did not see much action and split time between Edmonton and their CHL affiliates, Houston Apollos and Wichita Wind.

Career statistics

Regular season and playoffs

References

External links
 

1954 births
Living people
Calgary Cowboys players
Canadian expatriate ice hockey players in the United States
Canadian ice hockey left wingers
Edmonton Oilers players
Edmonton Oilers (WHA) players
Houston Apollos players
Ice hockey people from Ontario
Sportspeople from Kingston, Ontario
Indianapolis Racers players
Kingston Canadians players
Quebec Nordiques (WHA) players
Toronto Maple Leafs draft picks
Tulsa Oilers (1964–1984) players
Vancouver Blazers draft picks
Vancouver Blazers players
Wichita Wind players